Ubu Productions, Inc., was an independent production company founded in 1982 by television producer Gary David Goldberg. Ubu's notable productions include Family Ties (1982–1989), Brooklyn Bridge (1991–1993), and Spin City (1996–2002).

Ubu co-produced many of its shows with Paramount Television and in later years, DreamWorks Television.

The company closed down in 2002.

Mascot dog  
Ubu's mascot is Goldberg's dog Ubu Roi, a black labrador retriever which he had in college and subsequently traveled the world with. The closing tag for Ubu Productions is a photograph of Ubu Roi with a frisbee in his mouth, taken in the Tuileries Garden close to the Louvre Museum in Paris. Along with the picture is Goldberg himself saying "Sit, Ubu, sit! Good dog!", followed by the sound of a bark. The dog was named after Alfred Jarry's 1896 play Ubu Roi, considered a precursor to the Theatre of the Absurd. Ubu the dog died in 1984.

Filmography

Film

Television

References 

Television production companies of the United States
Mass media companies established in 1982
American independent film studios